Denis Guedj (1940 – April 24, 2010) was a French novelist and a professor of the History of Science at Paris VIII University. He was born in Setif. He spent many years devising courses and games to teach adults and children math. He is the author of Numbers: The Universal Language and of the novel The Parrot's Theorem. He died in Paris.

Bibliography
 La Méridienne, Éditions Seghers, 1987.
 La Révolution des savants, coll. « Découvertes Gallimard » (nº 48), série Sciences. Éditions Gallimard, 1988.
 L'empire des nombres, coll. « Découvertes Gallimard » (nº 300), série Sciences. Gallimard, 1996.
 US edition – Numbers: The Universal Language, "Abrams Discoveries" series. Harry N. Abrams, 1997
 UK edition – Numbers: The Universal Language, ‘New Horizons’ series. Thames & Hudson, 1998
 La Gratuité ne vaut plus rien et autres chroniques mathématiques, Éditions du Seuil, 1997.
 Le Théorème du Perroquet, Le Seuil, 1998.
 The Parrot's Theorem, Weidenfeld & Nicolson, 2000
 Génis ou le Bambou parapluie, Le Seuil, 1999.
 Le Mètre du monde, Le Seuil, 2000.
 La Bela - Autobiographie d'une caravelle, Le Seuil, 2001.
 One zéro show et Du point à la ligne, Le Seuil, 2001.
 , Le Seuil, 2003.
 , Robert Laffont, 2005.
 , Robert Laffont, 2007.
 Les mathématiques expliquées à mes filles, Le Seuil, 2008.

References

External links

Imaginary numbers, A review of The Parrot's Theorem by Simon Singh

1940 births
2010 deaths
20th-century French Sephardi Jews
Jewish French writers
People from Sétif
French male writers